Muroc Maru, officially AAF Temporary Building (Target) T-799, was a replica of a Japanese  constructed on the floor of Rogers Dry Lake in southern California during World War II. Used to train bomber pilots and bombardiers in techniques for attacking warships, Muroc Maru remained in place until 1950, when it was demolished.

Construction
AAF Temporary Building (Target) T-799 was built during 1943 on the southern end of Rogers Dry Lake in California for the purpose of training United States Army Air Forces bomber pilots, navigators and bombardiers in bombing, strafing, and the identification of warships, including skip bombing techniques. The lakebed site was chosen for the construction of the training structure as the bright sand dunes, sculpted to give the appearance of a wake around the 'ship', created the illusion of the vessel being at sea.

Designed to mimic the size and appearance of a Takao-class heavy cruiser of the Imperial Japanese Navy, the structure was constructed from four-by-four lumber and chicken wire, with tar paper covering the "hull" to complete the illusion of a solid, fully constructed ship. The structure cost $35,819.18 to build ($ in  dollars ).

Operational history

Upon completion of the structure, Army Air Force pilots assigned to train at the nearby Muroc Army Air Field – now Edwards Air Force Base – using the "ship" gave it the nickname Muroc Maru, after the location of the vessel and "Maru" being a common suffix for Japanese ship names. The structure was used for training until 1950, when it was declared a hazard to air navigation and disassembled following clearance of unexploded ordnance.

See also

References

External links
WW2 newsreel  on the Muroc Maru

Edwards Air Force Base
Landlocked ships
Closed training facilities of the United States Army
1943 establishments in California
1950 disestablishments in California
History of Kern County, California
Aviation in World War II
Buildings and structures in Kern County, California